Otitoma wiedricki is a species of sea snail, a marine gastropod mollusc in the family Pseudomelatomidae, the turrids and allies.

Description
The length of the shell varies between 4.5 mm and 6 mm.

Distribution
This marine species occurs off Mactan Island, Philippines

References

 Stahlschmidt P., Poppe G.T. & Tagaro S.P. (2018). Descriptions of remarkable new turrid species from the Philippines. Visaya. 5(1): 5-64 page(s): 27, pl. 21 figs 1-2.

External links
 Gastropods.com: Otitoma wiedricki

wiedricki
Gastropods described in 2018